Lars-Gunnar Carlstrand (born 29 August 1973) is a Swedish football attacking midfielder and striker.

Career
Carlstrand began his career at Västra Frölunda IF, as a trialist for St Johnstone but turned down a contract offer in December 1997 because he couldn't bring his dog to Scotland. He spent the early months of 1998 with Leicester City. Scoring in each of his first two Central League games, he was sent off in the third. His eventful spell at the Foxes was terminated after a five-game, four goal reserve  record; a near breakthrough at Ewood Park when the final whistle frustrated Martin O'Neill's attempt to introduce him as a late substitute; and a training ground broken nose. He then signed for Norwegian side Strømsgodset IF and returned to Sweden in 1999 to join IF Elfsborg, earning a domestic Cup Winners' Cup medal with the team in 2001. In March 2002, he rejoined Västra Frölunda IF and for 2003/04, he represented GAIS, the Gothenburg club where his father Gunnar had been a player in the early 1950s. He then briefly trained with Utsiktens BK before retiring from football.

References
Notes

Sources

1973 births
Living people
Swedish footballers
Swedish expatriate footballers
Association football forwards
Västra Frölunda IF players
Leicester City F.C. players
Strømsgodset Toppfotball players
IF Elfsborg players
GAIS players
Expatriate footballers in England
Expatriate footballers in Norway
Swedish expatriate sportspeople in England
Swedish expatriate sportspeople in Norway
Footballers from Gothenburg